The Brewster House in East Setauket, New York was listed on the National Register of Historic Places in 2008.   The house was originally built in 1665 and expanded in the early 18th century.   It was restored in 1968 to match the 1845 painting of "Long Island Farmhouses" by William Sidney Mount.   The site is currently owned by the Ward Melville Heritage Organization.

References

Houses on the National Register of Historic Places in New York (state)
Houses in Suffolk County, New York
National Register of Historic Places in Suffolk County, New York